Karunaratne is a Sinhalese surname. Notable people with the surname include:

Asoka Karunaratne (1916–1988), Sri Lankan politician and philanthropist
Dimuth Karunaratne (born 1988), Sri Lankan cricketer
Kuruppu Karunaratne (1960–2008), Sri Lankan long-distance runner who specialized in the marathon event
Kusuma Karunaratne (born 1940), Sri Lankan academic, university administrator, Professor and scholar of Sinhalese language and literature
Louis Karunaratne, Sri Lankan cricketer
M. D. Namal Karunaratne, Sri Lankan politician and a former member of the Parliament of Sri Lanka
Nayana Karunaratne, Sri Lankan beautician and a fashion designer
Niluka Karunaratne (born 1985), Sri Lankan Olympic athlete
Sam Karunaratne (born 1937), emeritus professor of engineering and the founding and current chancellor of the Sri Lanka Institute of Information Technology
Vikramabahu Karunaratne, Sri Lankan politician and contestant for the Sri Lankan presidential election
W. S. Karunaratne (1928–1986), Buddhist scholar and a fiercely independent thinker
Karunaratne Abeysekera (1930–1983), one of Sri Lanka's most famous Sinhala broadcasters

Sinhalese masculine given names
Sinhalese surnames